Birao (Mbirao) is a Southeast Solomonic language of Guadalcanal.

References

Gela-Guadalcanal languages
Languages of the Solomon Islands